The 2021–22 Moldovan "B" Division was the 31st season of Moldovan football's third-tier league. The season started on 14 August 2021 and ended on 28 May 2022. The league consisted of two regional groups, Nord (North) and Sud (South).

North

Results
Teams will play each other twice (once home, once away).

South

Results
Teams will play each other twice (once home, once away).

Top goalscorers

References

External links
 Divizia B - Results, fixtures, tables and news - Soccerway

Moldovan Liga 2 seasons
Moldova 3
2021–22 in Moldovan football